Molly Meech (born 31 March 1993) is a New Zealand sailor.

Meech won the 2013 49er FX World Championship and a silver medal at the 2016 Olympics alongside Alex Maloney. During the 2015 ISAF Sailing World Cup, Meech and Maloney competed in the women's 49erFX competitions, winning in Miami and coming second in Weymouth. They again won in Miami to start the 2016 season. Her brother, Sam also competed for New Zealand at the 2016 Olympics.

References

External links

 
 
 
 

1993 births
Olympic sailors of New Zealand
Living people
New Zealand female sailors (sport)
Sailors at the 2016 Summer Olympics – 49er FX
Olympic silver medalists for New Zealand
Olympic medalists in sailing
Medalists at the 2016 Summer Olympics
49er FX class world champions
World champions in sailing for New Zealand
Sailors at the 2020 Summer Olympics – 49er FX